Dembowski (meaning one from Dębowa) may refer to:

Astronomy
Dembowski (crater), an impact crater on the Moon
349 Dembowska, a main belt asteroid

People
 Bronisław Dembowski (1927–2019), Polish bishop
 Edward Dembowski (1822–1846), philosopher and Polish independence fighter
 Ercole Dembowski (1812–1881), Italian astronomer
 Jan Dembowski (1770-1823), Polish general
 Jan Bohdan Dembowski (1889–1963), Polish biologist
 Kazimierz Dembowski (1912–1942), Polish Jesuit
 Ludwik Mateusz Dembowski (1768–1812), Polish general
 Nancy Dembowski, American politician
 Peter Dembowski (1928–1971), German mathematician
 Rod Dembowski, American politician

See also
 Dabrowski (disambiguation)